Backstabbing for Beginners is a 2018 political thriller film directed and co-written by Per Fly, and based on the eponymous memoirs of Michael Soussan. It follows the real life corruption scandal in the UN Oil-for-Food Programme, and stars Theo James and Ben Kingsley.

Plot
The film follows Michael Sullivan, the son of US State Department diplomat who died when Michael was young. Michael leaves a lucrative job at a large bank and lands his dream job as a diplomat with the United Nations (UN), in the fall of 2002. He is assigned to work as an assistant to Under-Secretary-General Costa "Pasha" Passaris, the head of the Oil-for-Food Programme, operated since 1995 to help the citizens of Iraq without allowing the oil sales to boost Saddam Hussein and his regime. On his first visit to Baghdad, local UN chief diplomat Christina Dupre makes it clear to Pasha that she is disturbed by the corruption in the programme, and plans to publish a report voicing her concerns. This is the first Michael hears of the problem, and over the course of the film he uncovers a major corruption scandal, whereby payoffs and bribes diverted $20 billion of the funds away from food and into the hands of companies, banks, officials of various governments, and officials of the UN itself, possibly including Pasha, so that Hussein can pocket over $1 billion of the funds.

Michael falls in love with Nashim, a UN worker in Baghdad who reveals aspects of the corruption to Michael, while she covertly works to advance the cause of her own people, the Kurds of northern Iraq. Pasha tries to teach Michael about the realities of diplomacy in a world filled with corruption, highlighting that $60 billion does make it into buying food and medicine for the people of Iraq. As more of the people around him are killed, including Nashim and Dupre, and as the corruption continues even after the programme was de jure terminated in 2003, following the Coalition Invasion of Iraq, a dejected Michael gathers evidence and takes it to The Wall Street Journal.

Cast

Theo James as Michael
Ben Kingsley as Costa Pasaris, a.k.a. Pasha (fashioned after Benon Sevan, the actual head of the United Nations' Oil-for-Food Programme)
Belçim Bilgin as Nashim
Jacqueline Bisset as Dupre 
Rossif Sutherland as Trevor
Rachel Wilson as Lily
Brian Markinson as Rasnetsov
Aidan Devine as Cutter
Daniela Lavender as Ruth Zekar Kal
Peshang Rad as Hassan
Kardo Razazi as Abhek

Production
The film was a Canada, United States and Denmark co-production. Josh Hutcherson was originally set to star in the movie but dropped out and was replaced by Theo James. Filming started in March 2016 in Marrakech, Morocco, with other scenes shot in Copenhagen in April 2016. The production budget was $8 million.

Release
In June 2017, A24 and DirecTV Cinema acquired U.S. distribution rights to the film. The film was released in Denmark on 18 January 2018. The film was released through DirecTV Cinema on 22 March 2018, before being a limited release in the United States on 27 April 2018.

Reception
On Rotten Tomatoes, Backstabbing for Beginners got  approval from  reviews. Frank Scheck called the film "an inert would-be thriller". Jessica Kiang of the Variety Magazine has criticized forced intentions, that the filmmakers made, such as "romantic subplot, [which in addition to it, was] complete with heavy-breathing sex scene, and some of the more cloak-and-dagger-y intrigue show", which as she stated later is "to some extent Hollywood-izing a complicated and tragic real-world situation". Michael Rechtshaffen of Los Angeles Times said that "despite delivering few actual thrills, the fact-based Backstabbing for Beginners qualifies as an intelligent, well-crafted political thriller". Review aggregator Metacritic gave the film 48 out of a 100, basing its score on 8 reviews.

References

External links

2018 films
2018 independent films
2010s thriller films
2010s English-language films
2010s political thriller films
A24 (company) films
American films based on actual events
American political thriller films
Canadian films based on actual events
Canadian political thriller films
Danish political thriller films
English-language Canadian films
English-language Danish films
Films about corruption
Films about the United Nations
Films based on memoirs
Films directed by Per Fly
Films set in Baghdad
Films shot in Denmark
Films shot in Morocco
Films shot in Toronto
Political films based on actual events
Thriller films based on actual events
2010s American films
2010s Canadian films